Jeff Campbell (born May 9, 1981) is a Canadian professional ice hockey player who is currently playing with the SC Langenthal in the National League B.

Awards and honours

References

External links

1981 births
Canadian ice hockey right wingers
Grand Rapids Griffins players
Gwinnett Gladiators players
Kalamazoo Wings (UHL) players
Living people
Lowell Lock Monsters players
Norfolk Admirals players
Western Michigan Broncos men's ice hockey players
EHC Kloten players
Canadian expatriate ice hockey players in Switzerland